Mark Treyger (born April 15, 1982) is an American politician who served in the New York City Council for the 47th district from 2014 to 2021. He is a Democrat. The district includes portions of Bath Beach, Bensonhurst, Coney Island, Gravesend, and Sea Gate in Brooklyn.

Early life and education
Treyger was born in Brooklyn, New York. One of two children, he was the first in his family to be born in the United States. His sister Elina and his parents were all born in Ukraine, having emigrated from Mohyliv-Podilskyi. Raised in Bensonhurst, Brooklyn, he went to P.S./I.S. 226 and Edward R. Murrow High School. He received his bachelor's degree in political science and master's degree in social studies education both from Brooklyn College.

Teaching career
Treyger taught history at New Utrecht High School in Brooklyn and served as a delegate for the United Federation of Teachers.

New York City Council
In 2013, Councilman Domenic Recchia was term-limited and unable to run again. Treyger was elected to the City Council in the November 2013 elections. Four years later, he was re-elected winning by a landslide receiving 73% of the votes. In 2018 Treyger was appointed by Council Speaker Corey Johnson to chair the New York City Council's Education Committee.

References

External links

Living people
New York (state) Democrats
New York City Council members
Politicians from Brooklyn
People from Bensonhurst, Brooklyn
Brooklyn College alumni
American people of Ukrainian descent
1982 births
21st-century American politicians